The Nastro d'Argento (Silver Ribbon) is a film award assigned annually, since 1946, by Sindacato Nazionale dei Giornalisti Cinematografici Italiani ("Italian National Syndicate of Film Journalists") the association of Italian film critics.

This is the list of Nastro d'Argento awards for Lifetime Achievement.

Recipients 
1984 - Carlo Ludovico Bragaglia
1995 - Michelangelo Antonioni, Sophia Loren and Alberto Sordi
1996 - Ingmar Bergman
1998 - Nino Baragli
2001 - Armando Trovajoli
2003 - Luis Bacalov
2005 - Suso Cecchi d'Amico and Mario Monicelli
2006 - Stefania Sandrelli
2007 - Dino Risi
2008 - Piero De Bernardi, Giuliano Gemma, Carlo Lizzani and Vittorio Storaro
2010 - Ugo Gregoretti, Gilles Jacob, Ilaria Occhini and Armando Trovajoli
2011 - Emidio Greco, Fulvio Lucisano and Marina Piperno
2013 - Roberto Herlitzka
2014 - Marina Cicogna, Francesco Rosi and Piero Tosi
2018 - Gigi Proietti
2019 - Silvano Agosti
2020 - Toni Servillo

See also 
 Cinema of Italy

References

External links 
 Italian National Syndicate of Film Journalists official site  

Lifetime Achievement
Lifetime achievement awards